Habraken is a surname. Notable people with the surname include:

N. John Habraken (born 1928), Dutch architect, educator, and theorist
William Habraken, Dutch shoe collector